Roberta Lee Houston (born 16 January 1957), better known as Bobbie Houston, is a New Zealand-born Australian of Tongan descent and a Pentecostal pastor in the Australian Christian Churches.  Houston and her husband, Brian were the Senior Pastors of the Hillsong Church in Baulkham Hills, Sydney, Australia prior to the latter's departure in 2022.

Personal life

Bobbie and her husband, Brian Houston moved to Australia in February 1978, serving at Sydney Christian Life Centre, Darlinghurst, under Brian Houston's father, Frank Houston. In the early 1980s, Brian and Bobbie Houston started a church on the Central Coast, and a church in Liverpool. In 1983, they moved to Sydney's north-western suburbs and hired the Baulkham Hills Public School hall to start a new church, Hills Christian Life Centre. The first service was held on Sunday 14 August 1983 and is today Hillsong Church. Hillsong Church is located in major cities around the world.

The Colour Your World Women's Conference is hosted by Houston and the Hillsong team host in Sydney, London, the US, Cape Town and Kiev annually.

Ministry

Houston runs the weekly women's ministry of Hillsong. In 1997 she also started the annual Colour Your World Women's Conference.

The Colour Sisterhood is a foundation set up by Hillsong Church through Hillsong Women, the women's ministry of the church.

Houston was controversially made redundant on 8 April, which concluded her employment at Hillsong Church following her husband’s resignation, according to husband Brian Houston’s Instagram post.

Children
Houston's three grown children, Joel, Ben and
Laura Toganivalu live in Sydney and USA.

Bibliography 
Bobbie Houston has written several books. Below are details about her bibliography.

References

External links
Brian and Bobbie Houston's website 
Hillsong Sisterhood's website
Hillsong Church website

1957 births
Living people
Australian Christian Churches people
Australian people of Tongan descent
New Zealand Pentecostals
Hillsong Church
New Zealand people of Tongan descent
New Zealand emigrants to Australia